Joel Schwartz (born December 12, 1947 in Long Island, New York, United States) is an American epidemiologist, and Professor of Environmental Epidemiology, at Harvard University, School of Public Health.

He graduated from Brandeis University with a Ph.D. in 1980.
He identified the environmental exposure of lead in gasoline, which led to its ban.

He is a partner of the Michigan Metals Epidemiology Research Group.

Awards
 1991 MacArthur Fellows Program

References

External links
"An INTERVIEW with Dr. Joel Schwartz", Air Pollution
"Joel Schwartz", Scientific Commons

American epidemiologists
Brandeis University alumni
Harvard University faculty
MacArthur Fellows
Living people
1947 births
People from Long Island